Delamar Flat at  is the geographic sink of the Delamar Wash in the Delamar Valley.

References

Deserts of Nevada